Wong Chuk Hang San Wai is a village in the Wong Chuk Hang area of Southern District, Hong Kong. It is located at the bottom of Shouson Hill.

Administration
For electoral purposes, Wong Chuk Hang San Wai is part of the Bays Area constituency, which is currently represented by Jonathan Leung Chun.

History
Wong Chuk Hang San Wai was established in the 1860s and 1870s, as the population of nearby Wong Chuk Hang Kau Wai grew. Wong Chuk Hang Kau Wai had been established in the 18th century by members of the Chow clan of Guangdong province. Sir Shouson Chow is said to have been born in Wong Chuk Hang San Wai in 1861.

Wong Chuk Hang Kau Wai appears as 'Heung-kong-wai' ('Hong Kong Wai' in modern transliteration) on the "Map of the San-On District", published in 1866 by Simeone Volonteri. A substantial part of the village was demolished at the time of the construction of Aberdeen Tunnel.

At the time of the 1911 census, the population of Wong Chuk Hang was 57. The number of males was 44.

References

External links

 Antiquities Advisory Board. Historic Building Appraisal. No. 10 Wong Chuk Hang San Wai, Wong Chuk Hang Pictures

Villages in Southern District, Hong Kong
Wong Chuk Hang